Ahmed Jamil Madani (born 6 January 1970) is a retired Saudi Arabian footballer. He played in a defensive role. Madani is recognized as one of the best Saudi defenders in country and he was included in the best eleven in history of Saudi Arabia by IFFHS.

Career
A hardworking defender with good defensive skills. He was also characterized by physical attributes, in particular a high jumping ability.

Madani played his entire career for Al-Ittihad and also participated in many international tournaments. He helped to qualify for the 1994 FIFA World Cup. Madani was one of the key players during historical win against Belgium as well during the whole tournament. He was in the squad at the 1998 FIFA World Cup with the national team, but he didn't play a single game. 

He also participated at the 1987 FIFA World Youth Championship and 1989 FIFA World Youth Championship.

Honours

Al-Ittihad

Winner

Saudi Premier League (3): 1996–97, 1998–99, 1999–2000
Saudi King's Cup (1): 1988
Crown Prince Cup (2): 1991, 1997
Saudi Federation Cup (3): 1986, 1997, 1999
Gulf Club Champions Cup (1): 1999
Asian Cup Winners Cup (1): 1999

Runner-Up

Saudi Premier League (1): 1985–86
Saudi King's Cup (1): 1986
Crown Prince Cup (1): 1993
Saudi Federation cup (2): 1988, 1998
Arab Champions League (2): 1987, 1994

Saudi Arabia

Winner

Asian Cup (2): 1988, 1996
Gulf Cup of Nations (1): 1994

Runner-Up

Asian Cup (1): 1992

See also
 List of men's footballers with 100 or more international caps

References

1970 births
Living people
Saudi Arabian footballers
Saudi Arabia international footballers
Association football defenders
1988 AFC Asian Cup players
1992 AFC Asian Cup players
1994 FIFA World Cup players
1995 King Fahd Cup players
1996 AFC Asian Cup players
1997 FIFA Confederations Cup players
1998 FIFA World Cup players
AFC Asian Cup-winning players
Ittihad FC players
Sportspeople from Jeddah
FIFA Century Club
Footballers at the 1990 Asian Games
Saudi Professional League players
Asian Games competitors for Saudi Arabia
21st-century Saudi Arabian people
20th-century Saudi Arabian people